The United States Hockey Hall of Fame is located in Eveleth, Minnesota. It was established on June 21, 1973, with the purpose of honoring the sport of ice hockey in the United States by preserving American legends of the game. On May 11, 2007, USA Hockey and the United States Hockey Hall of Fame came to an agreement allowing the rights to the selection process and induction event associated to be handled by USA Hockey. After a class has been enshrined, anyone is allowed to nominate individuals to be considered for enshrinement in the following years class using the USA Hockey web site prior to the nomination deadline. Nominated individuals must be considered to have made an extraordinary contribution to the sport of ice hockey in America, but could come in any form such as player, coach, official, administrator or support personnel. A selection committee then reviews the nominations and decides who will be enshrined.

Enshrinees

† Names appear as they are displayed in the United States Hockey Hall of Fame.

See also
 List of NHL players
 List of members of the Hockey Hall of Fame

References

External links 
United States Hockey Hall of Fame Museum
United States Hockey Hall of Fame

 
United States Hockey Hall of Fame inductees